Shawn Harrison may refer to:

 Shawn Harrison (actor)
 Shawn Harrison (politician)